Fransham railway station is a former station in Great Fransham, Norfolk. It was opened as part of the Lynn and Dereham Railway, becoming part of the East Anglian Railway from 1847, on the section of line between Dereham and Swaffham.

History
The Lynn & Dereham Railway was given the Royal Assent on 21 July 1845, opened in stages between 1846 and 1848, and later became part of the Great Eastern Railway. Hunt's Directory of East Norfolk 1850 shows Edgar Skeit as a 'railway clerk'. However White's History, Gazetteer, and Directory, of Norfolk 1854 lists Edgar Skeet as being station master at Great Fransham. He would spend over 30 years in this role.

He was christened on 20 August 1804 at Ubbeston, Suffolk. William White's History, Gazetteer, and Directory of Norfolk 1883 lists him as still being stationmaster despite being 80 years old. He died in September 1888 aged 84 and is buried in the North East corner of Beeston churchyard.

In the early days, four passenger trains and one goods train would pass through the station each way daily giving ten movements.  Great Fransham was a halt between the two major junctions of East Dereham and Swaffham. The station also had a level crossing.

The original intention of the company had been to extend their line to Great Yarmouth, via Norwich, but this plan was blocked by the rival Wymondham to Dereham scheme proposed by the Norfolk Railway.

The line was closed to passenger and freight services by the Eastern Region of British Railways after last train on Saturday, 7 September 1968.

It was closed as part of the Beeching Axe. Beeching's report intended to retain the King's Lynn - Dereham - Norwich line (which was in fact closed).

Some items of rolling stock are kept at the station, although not on public display.  For a while the station was home to an unrestored 1916 Hudswell Clarke 0-6-0ST, works number 1208.  This was the last surviving locomotive from the Nidd Valley Light Railway.  It has since been purchased and removed for future use on the Embsay and Bolton Abbey Steam Railway.

Rolling stock

Passenger vehicles

References

Bibliography

External links
 Fransham station on 1946 O. S. map
 Photograph of Fransham station in 1975 

Disused railway stations in Norfolk
Former Great Eastern Railway stations
Railway stations in Great Britain opened in 1848
Railway stations in Great Britain closed in 1968
1848 establishments in England
1968 disestablishments in England